Helcionopsis is an extinct genus of paleozoic monoplacophoran in the family Tryblidiidae.

The generic name is from the external resemblance which the genus bear to the recent species of the genus Helcion in family Patellidae.

Species
Species in the genus Helcionopsis include:
 Helcionopsis radiatum (Lindström, 1884)
 Helcionopsis reticulatus Easton, 1943
 Helcionopsis striata Ulrich, 1897
 Helcionopsis subcarinata Ulrich & Scofield, 1897

Shell description
General form and position of apex is as in Tryblidium, from which Helcionopsis differ in having the surface marked by fine radiating striae. Muscular scars of this genus Helcionopsis unknown in 1897, when the genus was described.

References
This article incorporates public domain text from reference.

Prehistoric monoplacophorans
Prehistoric mollusc genera